Denys Olehovych Taraduda (born 17 August 2000) is a Ukrainian professional football player who plays for Lithuanian Dainava Club.

Club career
He made his Ukrainian Second League debut for Dnipro on 15 July 2017 in a game against Real Pharma Odesa. In summer 2022 he moved to Narva Trans in Estonia.

References

External links
 

2000 births
Living people
Ukrainian footballers
Association football defenders
FC Dnipro players
FC Vorskla Poltava players
FC Vovchansk players
FC SKA-Khabarovsk players
FC VPK-Ahro Shevchenkivka players
JK Narva Trans players
Ukrainian Premier League players
Ukrainian First League players
Ukrainian Second League players
Meistriliiga players
Russian First League players
Ukrainian expatriate footballers
Expatriate footballers in Russia
Ukrainian expatriate sportspeople in Russia
Expatriate footballers in Estonia
Ukrainian expatriate sportspeople in Estonia
Ukraine youth international footballers
Sportspeople from Donetsk Oblast